General Johann Petrus Coetzee  is a South African police officer. He was Commissioner of the South African Police from 1983 to 1987.

Personal life 

He has degrees in political science and history.

Career in the police 
He started his career in the Mounted Police, including as a member of the SA Police Royal Mounted Escort during the 1947 Royal visit to South Africa. Much of his career was spent in the Security Branch, where he co-ordinated the infiltration of anti-apartheid groups such as the South African Communist Party. As a young desk officer he recruited South Africa's first secret agent, Gerard Ludi, and as Security Chief he was the mentor of Major Craig Williamson, who had great success in infiltrating the International University Fund. 

On  he was made Commissioner of the South African Police; he was also a member of the State Security Council. He retired in May 1987.

While he was Commissioner, the South African Railway Police merged with the SA Police, a full-fledged Forensics branch was established and the SAP got a helicopter fleet.

Braam Fischer, the brilliant advocate who turned underground leader of the Communist Party, was ultimately unmasked by Coetzee, and arrested through the efforts of one of his agents, Gerad Ludi. Brigadiers Roelf van Rensburg and Kalfie Broodryk were the arresting Officers.

Awards 
General Coetzee was awarded the South African Police Star for Outstanding Service for the bravery he showed when he walked into the bank, unarmed, to negotiate with the MK Cadres during the Silverton Siege in Pretoria in 1981.

Truth and Reconciliation Commission

Coetzee, under cross-examination by George Bizos before the Truth and Reconciliation Commission, denied any involvement in several murders and other atrocities committed by the apartheid National Party government. He later applied for amnesty from the TRC in 2000.

References

See also 
 Johan Velde van der Merwe, fellow Commissioner of the South African Police
 South African Police
 Apartheid

 

South African police officers
Living people
20th-century South African people
1928 births